Carnivora is an order of placental mammals that have specialized in primarily eating flesh. Members of this order are called carnivorans, or colloquially carnivores, though the term more properly refers to any meat-eating organisms, and some carnivoran species are omnivores or herbivores. Carnivora is the fifth largest order of mammals and currently comprises 293 extant species, which are grouped into 131 genera. Carnivora can be divided into two suborders: the cat-like Feliformia and the dog-like Caniformia, which are differentiated largely based on the structure of their ear bones and cranial features. The majority of feliform species are found in the Old World, though the cats have successfully diversified into the Americas. Members of the Caniformia group are found worldwide. Carnivorans live on every major landmass and in a variety of habitats, including polar regions, hyper-arid deserts, and the open seas. Some carnivorans, such as cats, dogs, and the ferret, have been domesticated, resulting in a worldwide distribution.

The feliforms are further subdivided into seven families: Eupleridae, Felidae, Herpestidae, Hyaenidae, Nandiniidae, Prionodontinae, and Viverridae, and include the cats, the hyenas, the mongooses and the viverrids, among others. The caniforms are divided into nine families: Ailuridae, Canidae, Mephitidae, Mustelidae, Odobenidae, Otariidae, Phocidae, Procyonidae, and Ursidae, and include the dogs, bears, raccoons, weasels, and pinnipeds. The exact organization of the species is not fixed, with many recent proposals made based on molecular phylogenetic analysis, including smaller re-categorizations such as promoting the black mongoose subspecies of the slender mongoose to a full species or the 2011 discovery of the Vietnam ferret-badger, as well as larger changes such as formally recognizing the family Eupleridae as separate from Viverridae and Herpestidae in 2003. In addition to the extant species, six species have gone extinct since 1500 CE: the Falkland Islands wolf and South American fox in Canidae, the sea mink and Japanese otter in Mustelidae, the Japanese sea lion in Otariidae, and the Caribbean monk seal in Phocidae.

Conventions
Range maps are provided wherever possible; if a range map is not available, a description of the collective range of species in that genera is provided. Ranges are based on the International Union for Conservation of Nature (IUCN) Red List of Threatened Species unless otherwise noted. All extinct genera or species listed alongside extant species went extinct after 1500 CE, and are indicated by a dagger symbol "".

Classification
The order Carnivora consists of 292 extant species belonging to 131 genera as well the extinct genus Dusicyon, comprising 2 extinct species, and 4 other extinct species, which are the only carnivoran species to go extinct since prehistoric times. This does not include hybrid species (such as wolfdogs or ligers) or extinct prehistoric species. Modern molecular studies indicate that the 131 genera can be grouped into 16 families, split into the Caniformia and Feliformia clades, and several of these families are subdivided into named subfamilies. Three families of semi-aquatic animals, Odobenidae, Otariidae, and Phocidae, are collected into the suborder Pinnipedia.

Suborder Caniformia
 Family Ailuridae
 Subfamily Ailurinae (red pandas): 1 genus, 2 species
 Family Canidae
 Subfamily Caninae (wolves and foxes): 14 genera (one extinct), 39 species (two extinct)
 Family Mephitidae (skunks and stink badgers): 4 genera, 12 species
 Family Mustelidae
 Subfamily Guloninae (martens and wolverines): 4 genera, 9 species
 Subfamily Helictidinae (ferret-badgers): 1 genus, 5 species
 Subfamily Ictonychinae (African polecats and grisons): 5 genera, 7 species
 Subfamily Lutrinae (otters): 7 genera, 14 species (one extinct)
 Subfamily Melinae (Eurasian badgers): 2 genera, 6 species
 Subfamily Mellivorinae (honey badger): 1 genus, 1 species
 Subfamily Mustelinae (weasels and minks): 2 genera, 20 species (one extinct)
 Subfamily Taxidiinae (American badger): 1 genus, 1 species
 Clade Pinnipedia
 Family Odobenidae (walrus): 1 genus, 1 species
 Family Otariidae (eared seals): 7 genera, 16 species (one extinct)
 Family Phocidae (true seals): 14 genera, 19 species (one extinct)
 Family Procyonidae (raccoons, coatis, olingos, kinkajous): 6 genera, 14 species
 Family Ursidae
 Subfamily Ailuropodinae (panda bear): 1 genus, 1 species
 Subfamily Tremarctinae (short-faced bear): 1 genus, 1 species
 Subfamily Ursinae (bears): 3 genera, 6 species

Suborder Feliformia
 Family Eupleridae
 Subfamily Euplerinae (civet-like euplerids): 3 genera, 4 species
 Subfamily Galidiinae (mongoose-like euplerids): 4 genera, 6 species
 Family Felidae
 Subfamily Felinae (small and medium-sized cats): 12 genera, 34 species
 Subfamily Pantherinae (large cats): 2 genera, 7 species
 Family Herpestidae
 Subfamily Herpestinae (European/Asian mongooses): 9 genera, 23 species
 Subfamily Mungotinae (African mongooses): 6 genera, 11 species
 Family Hyaenidae (hyaenas): 3 genera, 4 species
 Family Nandiniidae (African palm civet): 1 genus, 1 species
 Family Prionodontidae (Asiatic linsangs): 1 genus, 2 species
 Family Viverridae
 Subfamily Genettinae (genets): 2 genera, 16 species
 Subfamily Hemigalinae (Southeast Asian civets): 4 genera, 4 species
 Subfamily Paradoxurinae (Asian civets): 5 genera, 7 species
 Subfamily Viverrinae (civets): 3 genera, 6 species

Carnivorans
The following classification is based on the taxonomy described by Mammal Species of the World (2005), with augmentation by generally accepted proposals made since using molecular phylogenetic analysis, including smaller re-categorizations such as promoting the black mongoose subspecies of the slender mongoose to a full species or the 2011 discovery of the Vietnam ferret-badger, as well as larger changes such as formally recognizing the family Eupleridae as separate from Viverridae and Herpestidae in 2003.

Suborder Caniformia

Ailuridae
The Ailuridae family is composed of two species, commonly called red pandas.

Canidae

Members of the Canidae family are canids and include domestic dogs, wolves, coyotes, foxes, jackals, and dingoes, among others. Canidae comprises 37 extant species, divided into 14 genera and placed inside a single extant subfamily, Caninae. Caninae is split into two tribes: Canini, comprising the wolf-like canids, and Vulpini, the fox-like canids.

Mephitidae

Members of the Mephitidae family are mephetids and include the skunks and stink badgers. Mephitidae comprises twelve extant species, divided into four genera, and is not split into subfamilies.

Mustelidae

Members of the Mustelidae family are mustelids and include weasels, badgers, otters, ferrets, martens, minks, and wolverines, among others. Mustelidae is the largest family in Carnivora, and comprises 63 extant species, divided into 23 genera. These genera are split into 8 subfamilies: Guloninae, martens and wolverines; Helictidinae, ferret-badgers; Ictonychinae, African polecats and grisons; Lutrinae, otters; Melinae, Eurasian badgers; Mellivorinae, the honey badger; Mustelinae, weasels and minks; and Taxidiinae, the American badger.

Clade Pinnipedia

Pinnipedia is an infraorder of carnivores, composed of seals, sea lions, and the walrus. A member of this group is called a pinniped or a seal. The clade contains three families: Odobenidae, comprising the walrus; Otariidae, the eared seals, split between the sea lions and fur seals; and Phocidae, the earless or true seals. Odobenidae and Otariidae are combined into the superfamily Otarioidea, with Phocidae in Phocoidea. These families are not subdivided into subfamilies.

Odobenidae
The Odobenidae family is composed of a single extant species, the walrus.

Otariidae
Members of the Otariidae family are otariids, or colloquially eared seals. There are sixteen species of sea lions and fur seals in Otariidae, divided into seven genera.

Phocidae
Members of the Phocidae family are phocids, or colloquially earless or true seals. There are nineteen species of seals in Phocidae, divided into fourteen genera.

Procyonidae

Members of the Procyonidae family are procyonids and include raccoons, coatis, olingos, kinkajous, ring-tailed cats, and cacomistles, among others. Procyonidae comprises fourteen extant species, divided into six genera.

Ursidae

Members of the Ursidae family are ursids, or colloquially bears. Ursidae comprises three extant subfamilies: the monotypic Ailuropodinae, the panda bears; Tremarctinae, the short-faced bears; and Ursinae, containing all other extant bears. There are eight extant species in Ursidae, divided into five genera.

Suborder Feliformia

Eupleridae
Members of the Eupleridae family are euplerids, or colloquially Malagasy mongooses or Malagasy carnivorans. Eupleridae comprises two extant subfamilies, the civet-like Euplerinae and the mongoose-like Galidiinae. Historically, the Euplerinae species were included in the civet family Viverridae, and several of the Galidiinae species in the mongoose family Herpestidae, but more recent genetic evidence showed them to be part of the same clade, having evolved from a single ancestor species 18–24 million years ago. There are 10 extant species in Eupleridae, divided into 7 genera.

Felidae

Members of the Felidae family are felids, or colloquially cats; "cat" refers both to felids in general and specifically to domestic cats. Felidae comprises two extant subfamilies, Felinae (small cats) and Pantherinae (large cats). There are 34 extant species in Felidae, divided into 14 genera.

Herpestidae

Members of the Herpestidae family are herpestids, or colloquially mongooses. Herpestidae comprises two extant subfamilies, Herpestinae, comprising the species that are native to southern Europe, Africa and Asia, and Mungotinae, comprising the species native to Africa. There are 34 extant species in Herpestidae, divided into 15 genera.

Hyaenidae

Members of the Hyaenidae family are hyaenids, or colloquially hyenas. Hyaenidae comprises four extant species, divided into four genera.

Nandiniidae

The Nandiniidae family is composed of a single extant species, the African palm civet.

Prionodontidae

The Prionodontidae family is composed of a single extant species in a single genus.

Viverridae

Members of the Viverridae family are viverrids, and the family is composed mainly of the civets and genets. Viverridae comprises four extant subfamilies, the 3 civet subfamilies Viverrinae, Hemigalinae, and Paradoxurinae, and the genet subfamily Genettinae. There are 33 extant species in Viverridae, divided into 14 genera.

See also
 Mammal classification

References

Sources

 
 
 
 
 
 
 
 
 
 
 
 
 
 
 
 
 
 
 
 
 
 
 
 
 
 
 

 
Carnivora
Carnivora